The Webster–Ashburton Treaty, signed August 9, 1842, was a treaty that resolved several border issues between the United States and the British North American colonies (the region that became Canada). Signed under John Tyler's presidency, it resolved the so-called Aroostook War.  The provisions of the treaty included:

 The settlement of the location of the Maine–New Brunswick border, which was the primary cause of the Aroostook War.
 Establishment of the border between Lake Superior and the Lake of the Woods, originally defined in the Treaty of Paris in 1783;
 Reaffirmation of the location of the border (at the 49th parallel) in the westward frontier up to the Rocky Mountains defined in the Treaty of 1818;
 Definition of seven crimes subject to extradition;
 Agreement that the two parties would share use of the Great Lakes; 
 Agreement that there should be a final end to the slave trade on the high seas.

The treaty also retroactively confirmed the southern boundary of Quebec that land surveyors John Collins and Thomas Valentine had marked with stone monuments in 1771–1773. The treaty intended that the border be at 45 degrees north latitude, but the border is in some places nearly a half mile north of the parallel. The treaty was signed by United States Secretary of State Daniel Webster and British diplomat Alexander Baring, 1st Baron Ashburton.

In the East

An arbitration of various border issues in the East before King William I of the Netherlands in 1831 had failed to yield a binding decision.

The Treaty of Paris had established the 45th parallel as part of the northern boundary of modern-day New York and Vermont. Most of that portion of the boundary had previously been surveyed in the early 1770s, but the survey line was inaccurate. Since "Fort Blunder"—an unnamed U.S. fort in what is now part of northeastern New York—had been constructed north of the actual 45th parallel, the United States wanted to follow the old survey line, and the Webster–Ashburton treaty incorporated this change, leaving the half-finished fort on U.S. soil. Following the signing of the treaty, the U.S. resumed construction on the site. The new project replaced the aborted 1812-era construction with a massive third-system masonry fortification known as Fort Montgomery.

This treaty marked the end of local confrontations between lumberjacks  (known as the Aroostook War) along the Maine border with the British colonies of Lower Canada (which later became Quebec) and New Brunswick. The newly agreed border divided the disputed territory between the two nations. The British were assigned the Halifax–Quebec road route, which their military desired because Lower Canada had no other connection in winter to New Brunswick and Nova Scotia. The treaty adjusted portions of the border to give the United States a little more land to the north. It also resolved issues that had led to the Indian Stream dispute as well as the Caroline Affair. The Indian Stream area was assigned to the United States. The Webster–Ashburton Treaty failed to clarify ownership of Machias Seal Island and nearby North Rock, which remain in dispute. Additionally, the signing of the treaty put an end to several building improvements planned for Upper Canadian defense forts such as Fort Malden in Amherstburg, which the British government later abandoned, as they no longer served a defensive purpose.

In the West

The border between Lake Superior and the Lake of the Woods needed clarification because the faulty Mitchell Map used in the negotiations for the Treaty of Paris was inadequate to define the border according to the terms of that treaty. Ambiguity in the map and treaty resulted in Minnesota's Arrowhead region being disputed, and previous negotiations had not resolved the question. The treaty had the border pass through Long Lake, but did not state that lake's location. However, the map showed the lake flowing into Lake Superior near Isle Royale, which is consistent with the Pigeon River route.

The British, however, had previously taken the position that the border should leave Lake Superior at Fond du Lac (the "head of the lake") in modern Duluth, Minnesota, proceed up the Saint Louis and Embarrass rivers, across the height of land, and down Pike River and Lake Vermilion to the Rainy River.

To counter this western route, the U.S. advocated for an eastern route, used by early French explorer Jacques de Noyon in 1688, and the later a well-used fur traders' route after 1802.  This way headed north from the lake at the site of Fort William up the Kaministiquia and Dog Rivers to Cold Water Lake, crossed the divide by Prairie Portage to Height of Land Lake, then went west by way of the Savanne, Pickerel, and Maligne rivers to Lake La Croix, where it joined the present border.

The Mitchell map had shown both of those routes, and also showed the "Long Lake" route between them. Long Lake was thought to be the Pigeon River (despite the absence of a lake at its mouth).

The traditional traders' route left the Lake at Grand Portage and went overland to the Pigeon, up that river and a tributary across the Height of Land Portage, and thence down tributaries of the Rainy River to Lac La Croix, Rainy Lake and River, and Lake of the Woods. This is finally the route the treaty designated as the border.

The treaty clarified the channel that the border would follow between Lake Huron and Lake Superior, awarding Sugar Island to the U.S.

Another clarification made in this treaty resulted in clarifying the anomaly of the Northwest Angle. Again, due to errors on the Mitchell Map, Treaty of Paris reads "... through the Lake of the Woods to the most northwesternmost point thereof, and from thence on a due west course to the river Mississippi ..." In fact, a course due west from the Lake of the Woods never intersects the Mississippi. The Anglo-American Convention of 1818 defined the boundary about Lake of the Woods to the Rocky Mountains.

This 1842 treaty reaffirmed the border and further defined it by modifying the border definition to instead read as: 

The Webster–Ashburton Treaty failed to deal with the Oregon question, although the issue was discussed in negotiations.

Other issues
Article 10 of the Webster–Ashburton Treaty identified seven crimes subject to extradition: "murder, or assault with intent to commit murder, or piracy, or arson, or robbery, or forgery, or the utterance of forged paper." It did not include slave revolt or mutiny. In addition, the United States did not press for the return or extradition of an estimated 12,000 fugitive slaves who had reached Canada.

While agreeing to call for a final end to the slave trade on the high seas, Webster and Ashburton agreed to pass over the Creole case of 1841 in the Caribbean, which was then in contention. In November 1841, a slave revolt on the American brig Creole, part of the coastwise slave trade, had forced the ship to Nassau. Bahamian officials eventually emancipated all 128 slaves who chose to stay in Nassau, as Britain had abolished slavery in its colonies, effective in 1834. The U.S. initially demanded return of the slaves, then compensation. A settlement was made in 1855 as part of a much larger claims treaty of 1853, covering claims by both nations to 1814.

The treaty laid down minimum levels of anti-slaving naval activity off the West African coast by the US Navy and the Royal Navy. It formalised levels of co-operation that had briefly existed in 1820 and 1821. It did fall short of providing greater co-operation in suppression of the slave trade; there was, for instance, no mutual right for the two countries to inspect vessels flying each other's flag (even when the US colours were being flown fraudulently by a slaver from a third country). It therefore had only a minimal effect in reducing the trade.

Results

As a result of the Webster–Ashburton Treaty, the United States ceded  of disputed territory along the Maine border, including the Halifax–Quebec Route, but kept  of  the disputed wilderness. In addition, the United States received  of land along the Minnesota–Canada border, which included the Mesabi Range. Shortly after ratification of the Webster–Ashburton treaty, the Ojibwa nations about the south shore of Lake Superior ceded land to the United States in the Treaty of La Pointe. However, the news of the ratification of the international treaty did not reach either of the parties negotiating the land cession. The Grand Portage Band was mistakenly omitted from the Ojibwe treaty council. In addition, the Grand Portage Band was misinformed on the details of the Treaty of Paris; they believed that the border passed through the center of Lake Superior to the Saint Louis River, placing both Isle Royale and their band in British territory.  The Treaty of Paris specifically notes Isle Royale as in the territories of the United States. Consequently, the Isle Royale Agreement was signed between the United States and the Grand Portage Band in 1844 as an adhesion to the Treaty of La Pointe, with other Ojibwa tribes reaffirming the treaty.

Ten months of negotiations for the treaty were held largely at the Ashburton House, home of the British legation on Lafayette Square in Washington, D.C.  The house has been designated a U.S. National Historic Landmark.

To make the controversial treaty more popular in the United States, Webster released a map of the Maine–Canada border, which he claimed Benjamin Franklin had drawn. It showed contested areas largely resolved in favor of the United States.

See also
 List of treaties
 History of Canada–United States border agreements through 1908
 Timeline of United States diplomatic history
 Estcourt Station, Maine
 Slave Trade Acts
 United Kingdom–United States relations

Notes

References

Works cited

Further reading

 
  (the standard scholarly history)
 
 
 
 
 
 
  (shows the value of the iron range was not known when the treaty was drawn)

External links

 Text of the Webster–Ashburton Treaty  (The Avalon Project at Yale Law School)
 Webster–Ashburton Treaty (U.S. Department of State)
 Franklin Map Possibly Forged

Canada–United States treaties
United Kingdom–United States treaties
1842 treaties
Boundary treaties
Canada–United States border
History of the foreign relations of the United States
Legal history of Canada
Aroostook War
North Maine Woods
1842 in Canada
1842 in the United States
Treaties of the United Kingdom (1801–1922)
Daniel Webster